Linux adoption is the adoption of Linux computer operating systems (OS) by households, nonprofit organizations, businesses, and governments.

Many factors have resulted in the expanded use of Linux systems by traditional desktop users as well as operators of server systems, including the desire to minimize software costs, increase network security and support for open-source philosophical principles. In recent years several governments, at various levels, have enacted policies shifting state-owned computers to Linux from proprietary software regimes.

In August 2010, Jeffrey Hammond, principal analyst at Forrester Research, declared, "Linux has crossed the chasm to mainstream adoption," a statement attested by the large number of enterprises that had transitioned to Linux during the late-2000s recession. In a company survey completed in the third quarter of 2009, 48% of surveyed companies reported using an open-source operating system.

The Linux Foundation regularly releases publications regarding the Linux kernel, Linux OS distributions, and related themes. One such publication, "Linux Adoption Trends: A Survey of Enterprise End Users," is freely available upon registration.

Traditionally, the term Linux adoption refers to adoption of a Linux OS made for "desktop" computers, the original intended use (or adoption on servers, that is essentially the same form of OS). Adoption of that form on personal computers is still low relatively, while adoption of the Android operating system is very high. The term Linux adoption, often overlooks that operating system or other uses such as in ChromeOS that also use the Linux kernel (but have almost nothing else in common, not even the name – Linux – usually applied; while Android is the most popular variant – in fact the most popular operating system in the world).

Linux adopters

Outside of traditional web services, Linux powers many of the biggest Internet properties (e.g., Google, Amazon, Facebook, eBay, Twitter or Yahoo!).

Hardware platforms with graphical user interface
Linux is used on desktop computers, servers and supercomputers, as well as a wide range of devices.

Desktop and Nettop computers and Laptops

Measuring desktop adoption
Because Linux desktop distributions are not usually distributed by retail sale, there are no sales numbers that indicate the number of users. One downloaded file may be used to create many CDs and each CD may be used to install the operating system on multiple computers. On the other hand, the file might be used only for a test and the installation erased soon after. Due to these factors estimates of current Linux desktop often rely on webpage hits by computers identifying themselves as running Linux. The use of these statistics has been criticized as unreliable and as underestimating Linux use.

Using webpage hits as a measure, until 2008, Linux accounted for only about 1% of desktop market share, while Microsoft Windows operating systems held more than 90%. This might have been because Linux was not seen at that time as a direct replacement for Windows.

, W3Counter estimated "Linux" web browser market share to be 4.63%, while "Android" versions 6, 5 and 4 combined (which is based on the Linux kernel) were estimated to be 33.77%.

In September 2014 Pornhub released usage statistics of their website and reported 1.7% Linux users.

The Unity game engine gathers user statistics and showed in March 2016 0.4% Linux users. Similarly, the Steam client tracks usage and reported in May 2015 around 1% Linux users.

In April 2009, Aaron Seigo of KDE indicated that most web-page counter methods produce Linux adoption numbers that are far too low given the system's extensive penetration into non-North American markets, especially China. He stated that the North American-based web-measurement methods produce high Windows numbers and ignore the widespread use of Linux in other parts of the world. In estimating true worldwide desktop adoption and accounting for the Windows-distorted environment in the US and Canada he indicated that at least 8% of the world desktops run Linux distributions and possibly as high as 10–12% and that the numbers are rising quickly. Other commentators have echoed this same belief, noting that competitors are expending a lot of effort to discredit Linux, which is incongruent with a tiny market share:

In May 2009, Preston Gralla, contributing editor to Computerworld.com, in reacting to the Net Applications web hit numbers showing that Linux use was over 1%, said that "Linux will never become an important desktop or notebook operating system". He reasoned that the upsurge in Linux desktop use recently seen was due to Linux netbooks, a trend he saw as already diminishing and which would be further eroded when Windows 7 became available (and indeed, Linux netbooks did fall by the wayside, though whether they were solely responsible for the upsurge in Linux usage is open to question). He concluded: "As a desktop operating system, Linux isn't important enough to think about. For servers, it's top-notch, but you likely won't use it on your desktop – even though it did finally manage to crack the 1% barrier after 18 years".

In 2009, Microsoft then-CEO Steve Ballmer indicated that Linux had a greater desktop market share than Mac, stating that in recent years Linux had "certainly increased its share somewhat". Just under a third of all Dell netbook sales in 2009 had Linux installed.

Caitlyn Martin, researching retail market numbers in the summer of 2010 also concluded that the traditional numbers mentioned for Linux desktop adoption were far too low:

Reasons for adoption
Reasons to change from other operating systems to Linux include better system stability, better malware protection, low or no cost, that most distributions come complete with application software and hardware drivers, simplified updates for all installed software, free software licensing, availability of application repositories and access to the source code. Linux desktop distributions also offer multiple desktop workspaces, greater customization, free and unlimited support through forums, and an operating system that doesn't slow down over time. Environmental reasons are also cited, as Linux operating systems usually do not come in boxes and other retail packaging, but are downloaded via the Internet. The lower system specifications also mean that older hardware can be kept in use instead of being recycled or discarded. Linux distributions also get security vulnerabilities patched much more quickly than non-free operating systems and improvements in Linux have been occurring at a faster rate than those in Windows.

A report in The Economist in December 2007 said:

Further investments have been made to improve desktop Linux usability since that 2007 report.

Indian bulk computer purchaser the Electronics Corporation of Tamil Nadu (ELCOT) started recommending only Linux in June 2008. Following testing they stated: "ELCOT has been using SUSE Linux and Ubuntu Linux operating systems on desktop and laptop computers numbering over 2,000 during the past two years and found them far superior as compared to other operating systems, notably the Microsoft Windows Operating System."

In many developing nations, such as China, where, due to widespread software piracy, Microsoft Windows can be easily obtained for free, Linux distributions are gaining a high level of adoption. Hence in these countries where there is essentially no cost barrier to obtaining proprietary operating systems, users are adopting Linux based on its merit, rather than on price.

In January 2001, Microsoft then-CEO Bill Gates explained the attraction of adopting Linux in an internal memo that was released in the Comes vs Microsoft case. He said:

Barriers to adoption
The greatest barrier to Linux desktop adoption is probably that few desktop PCs come with it from the factory. A.Y. Siu asserted in 2006 that most people use Windows simply because most PCs come with Windows pre-installed; they didn't choose it. Linux has much lower market penetration because in most cases users have to install it themselves, a task that is beyond the capabilities of many PC users: "Most users won’t even use Windows restore CDs, let alone install Windows from scratch. Why would they install an unfamiliar operating system on their computers?"

TechRepublic writer Jack Wallen expands on this barrier, saying in August 2008:

Linus Torvalds stated, in his June 2012 interaction with students at Aalto University, that although Linux was originally conceived as a desktop system, that has been the only market where it has not flourished. He suggested that the key reason that keeps Linux from getting a substantial presence in the desktop market is that the average desktop user does not want to install an operating system, so getting manufacturers to sell computers with Linux pre-installed would be the missing piece to fulfill the vision of Linux in the desktop market. He added that Chromebooks, by shipping with the Linux-based ChromeOS, could provide the key turning point in such a transition, much like Android allowed Linux to spread in the mobile space.

In September 2012, GNOME developer Michael Meeks also indicated that the main reason for the lack of adoption of Linux desktops is the lack of manufacturers shipping computers with it pre-installed, supporting Siu's arguments from six years earlier. Meeks also indicated that users wouldn't embrace desktop Linux until there is a wider range of applications and developers won't create that wider range of applications until there are more users, a classic Catch-22 situation.

In an openSUSE survey conducted in 2007, 69.5% of respondents said they dual booted a Microsoft Windows operating system in addition to a Linux operating system. In early 2007 Bill Whyman, an analyst at Precursor Advisors, noted that "there still isn't a compelling alternative to the Microsoft infrastructure on the desktop."

Application support, the quality of peripheral support, and end user support were at one time seen as the biggest obstacles to desktop Linux adoption. According to a 2006 survey by The Linux Foundation, these factors were seen as a "major obstacle" for 56%, 49%, and 33% of respondents respectively at that time.

Application support

The November 2006 Desktop Linux Client Survey identified the foremost barrier for deploying Linux desktops was that users were accustomed to Windows applications which had not been ported to Linux and which they "just can't live without". These included Microsoft Office, Adobe Photoshop, Autodesk AutoCAD, Microsoft Project, Visio and Intuit QuickBooks. This creates a chicken or the egg situation where developers make programs for Windows due to its market share, and consumers use Windows due to availability of said programs.
In a DesktopLinux.com survey conducted in 2007, 72% of respondents said they used ways to run Windows applications on Linux.

51% of respondents to the 2006 Linux Foundation survey, believed that cross-distribution Linux desktop standards should be the top priority for the Linux desktop community, highlighting the fact that the fragmented Linux market is preventing application vendors from developing, distributing and supporting the operating system. In May 2008, Gartner predicted that "version control and incompatibilities will continue to plague open-source OSs and associated middleware" in the 2013 timeframe.

By 2008, the design of Linux applications and the porting of Windows and Apple applications had progressed to the point where it was difficult to find an application that did not have an equivalent for Linux, providing adequate or better capabilities.

An example of application progress can be seen comparing the main productivity suite for Linux, OpenOffice.org, to Microsoft Office. With the release of OpenOffice.org 3.0 in October 2008 Ars Technica assessed the two:

Peripheral support
In the past the availability and quality of open source device drivers were issues for Linux desktops. Particular areas which were lacking drivers included printers as well as wireless and audio cards. For example, in early 2007, Dell did not sell specific hardware and software with Ubuntu 7.04 computers, including printers, projectors, Bluetooth keyboards and mice, TV tuners and remote controls, desktop modems and Blu-ray drives, due to incompatibilities at that time, as well as legal issues.

By 2008, most Linux hardware support and driver issues had been adequately addressed. In September 2008, Jack Wallen's assessment was:

End-user support
Some critics have stated that compared to Windows, Linux is lacking in end-user support. Linux has traditionally been seen as requiring much more technical expertise. Dell's website described open source software as requiring intermediate or advanced knowledge to use. In September 2007, the founder of the Ubuntu project, Mark Shuttleworth, commented that "it would be reasonable to say that this is not ready for the mass market."

In October 2004, Chief Technical Officer of Adeptiva Linux, Stephan February, noted at that time that Linux was a very technical software product, and few people outside the technical community were able to support consumers. Windows users are able to rely on friends and family for help, but Linux users generally use discussion boards, which can be uncomfortable for consumers.

In 2005, Dominic Humphries summarized the difference in user tech support:

More recently critics have found that the Linux user support model, using community-based forum support, has greatly improved. In 2008 Jack Wallen stated:

In addressing the question of user support, Manu Cornet said:

Other factors
Linux's credibility has also been under attack at times, but as Ron Miller of LinuxPlanet points out:

There is continuing debate about the total cost of ownership of Linux, with Gartner warning in 2005 that the costs of migration may exceed the cost benefits of Linux. Gartner reiterated the warning in 2008, predicting that "by 2013, a majority of Linux deployments will have no real software total cost of ownership (TCO) advantage over other operating systems." However, in the Comes v. Microsoft lawsuit, Plaintiff's exhibit 2817 revealed that Microsoft successfully lobbied Gartner for changing their TCO model in favour of Microsoft in 1998. Organizations that have moved to Linux have disagreed with these warnings. Sterling Ball, CEO of Ernie Ball, the world's leading maker of premium guitar strings and a 2003 Linux adopter, said of total cost of ownership arguments: "I think that's propaganda...What about the cost of dealing with a virus? We don't have 'em...There's no doubt that what I'm doing is cheaper to operate. The analyst guys can say whatever they want."

In the SCO-Linux controversies, the SCO Group had alleged that UNIX source code donated by IBM was illegally incorporated into Linux. The threat that SCO might be able to legally assert ownership of Linux initially caused some potential Linux adopters to delay that move. The court cases bankrupted SCO in 2007 after it lost its four-year court battle over the ownership of the UNIX copyrights. SCO's case had hinged on showing that Linux included intellectual property that had been misappropriated from UNIX, but the case failed when the court discovered that Novell and not SCO was the rightful owner of the copyrights. During the legal process, it was revealed that SCO's claims about Linux were fraudulent and that SCO's internal source code audits had showed no evidence of infringement.

A rival operating system vendor, Green Hills Software, has called the open source paradigm of Linux "fundamentally insecure".

The US Army does not agree that Linux is a security problem. Brigadier General Nick Justice, the Deputy Program Officer for the Army's Program Executive Office, Command, Control and Communications Tactical (PEO C3T), said in April 2007:

Netbooks

In 2008, Gartner analysts predicted that mobile devices like Netbooks with Linux could potentially break the dominance of Microsoft's Windows as operating system provider, as the netbook concept focuses on OS-agnostic applications built as Web applications and browsing. Until 2008 the netbook market was dominated by Linux-powered devices; this changed in 2009 after Windows XP became available as option. One of the reasons given was that many customers returned Linux-based netbooks as they were still expecting a Windows-like environment, despite the netbook vision: a web-surfing and web-application device.

Thin clients

In 2011, Google introduced the Chromebook, a thin client running the Linux-based ChromeOS, with the ability to use web applications and remote desktop in to other computers running Windows, Mac OS X, a traditional Linux distribution or ChromeOS, using Chrome Remote Desktop. In 2012 Google and Samsung introduced the first version of the Chromebox, a small-form-factor desktop equivalent to the Chromebook.

By 2013, Chromebooks had captured 20–25% of the sub-$300 US laptop market.

Mobile devices

Android, which is based on Linux and is open source, is the most popular mobile platform. During the second quarter of 2013, 79.3% of smartphones sold worldwide were running Android. Android tablets are also available.

Discontinued Linux-based mobile operating systems 
Firefox OS was another open source Linux-based mobile operating system, which has now been discontinued.

Nokia previously produced some phones running a variant of Linux (e.g. the Nokia N900), but in 2013, Nokia's handset division was bought by Microsoft.

Other embedded systems with graphical user interface
Smartphones are gradually replacing these kinds of embedded devices, but they still exist. An example are the Portable media players. Some of the OEM firmware is Linux based. A community-driven fully free and open-source project is Rockbox.

In-vehicle infotainment hardware usually involves some kind of display, either built into the Dashboard or additional displays. The GENIVI Alliance, now called COVESA (Connected Vehicle Systems Alliance), works on a Linux-based open platform to run the IVI. It may have an interface to some values delivered by the Engine control unit but is albeit completely separate system. There will be a special variant of Tizen for IVI, different for the Tizen for smartphones in several regards.

Hardware platforms without graphical user interface

Embedded systems without graphical user interface

Linux is often used in various single- or multi-purpose computer appliances and embedded systems.

Customer-premises equipment are a group of devices that are embedded and have no graphical user interface in the common sense. Some are remotely operated via Secure Shell or via some Web-based user interface running on some lightweight web server software. Most of the OEM firmware is based on the Linux kernel and other free and open-source software, e.g. Das U-Boot and Busybox. There are also a couple of community driven projects, e.g. OpenWrt.

Smaller scale embedded network-attached storage-devices are also mostly Linux-driven.

Servers

Linux became popular in the Internet server market particularly due to the LAMP software bundle. In September 2008 Steve Ballmer (Microsoft CEO) claimed 60% of servers run Linux and 40% run Windows Server. According to IDC's report covering Q2 2013, Linux was up to 23.2% of worldwide server revenue although this does compensate for the potential price disparity between Linux and non-Linux servers. In May 2014, W3Techs estimated that 67.5% of the top 10 million (according to Alexa) websites run some form of Unix, and Linux is used by at least 57.2% of all those websites which use Unix.

Web servers
Linux-based solution stacks come with all the general advantages and benefits of free and open-source software. Some more commonly known examples are:
 LAMP
 MEAN stack

According to the Netcraft, nginx had the highest market share.

LDAP servers

There are various freely available implementations of LDAP servers. Additionally, Univention Corporate Server, as an integrated management system based on Debian, supports the functions provided by Microsoft Active Directory for the administration of computers running Microsoft Windows.

Routers
Free routing software available for Linux includes BIRD, B.A.T.M.A.N., Quagga and XORP. Whether on Customer-premises equipment, on Personal computer hardware or on server-hardware, the mainline Linux kernel or an adapted highly optimized Linux kernel is capable of doing routing at rates that are limited by the hardware bus throughput.

Supercomputers

Linux is the most popular operating system among supercomputers due to the general advantages and benefits of free and open-source software, like superior performance, flexibility, speed and lower costs. In November 2008 Linux held an 87.8 percent share of the world's top 500 supercomputers.

Since June 2018, every computer on the TOP500 list ran some version of Linux.

In January 2010, Weiwu Hu, chief architect of the Loongson family of CPUs at the Institute of Computing Technology, which is part of the Chinese Academy of Sciences, confirmed that the new Dawning 6000 supercomputer will use Chinese-made Loongson processors and will run Linux as its operating system. The most recent supercomputer the organization built, the Dawning 5000a, which was first run in 2008, used AMD chips and ran Windows HPC Server 2008.

Advocacy
Many organizations advocate for Linux adoption. The foremost of these is the Linux Foundation which hosts and sponsors the key kernel developers, manages the Linux trademark, manages the Open Source Developer Travel Fund, provides legal aid to open source developers and companies through the Linux Legal Defense Fund, sponsors kernel.org and also hosts the Patent Commons Project.

The International Free and Open Source Software Foundation (iFOSSF) is a nonprofit organization based in Michigan, USA dedicated to accelerating and promoting the adoption of FOSS worldwide through research and civil society partnership networks.

The Open Invention Network was formed to protect vendors and customers from patent royalty fees while using OSS.

Other advocates for Linux include:
 IBM through its Linux Marketing Strategy
 Linux User Groups
 Asian Open Source Centre (AsiaOSC)
 The Brazilian government, under president Luiz Inácio Lula da Silva
 Software Livre Brasil, a Brazilian organization promoting Linux adoption in schools, public departments, commerce, industry and personal desktops.
 FOSS: Free and Open Source Software Foundations of India and China.

History

Gartner claimed that Linux-powered personal computers accounted for 4% of unit sales in 2008. However, it is common for users to install Linux in addition to (as a dual boot arrangement) or in place of a factory-installed Microsoft Windows operating system.

Timeline

 1983 (September): GNU project announced publicly
 1991 (September): First version of the Linux kernel released to the Internet
 mid-1990s: Linux runs on cluster computers at NASA and elsewhere
 late 1990s: Dell, IBM and Hewlett-Packard offer commercial support for Linux on their hardware; Red Hat and VA Linux have initial public offerings
 1999: EmperorLinux started shipping specially configured laptops running modified Linux distributions to ensure usability
 2001 (second quarter): Linux server unit shipments recorded a 15% annual growth rate
 2004: Linux shipped on approximately 50% of the worldwide server blade units, and 20% of all rack-optimized servers
 2005: System76, a Linux-only computer OEM, starts selling Ubuntu pre-installed on laptops and desktops.

2007
 Dell announced it would ship select models with Ubuntu Linux pre-installed
 ZaReason is founded as a Linux only hardware OEM.
 Lenovo announced it would ship select models with SUSE Linux Enterprise Desktop pre-installed
 HP announced that it would begin shipping computers preinstalled with Red Hat Enterprise Linux in Australia
 ASUS launched the Linux-based ASUS Eee PC

2008
 Dell announced it would begin shipping Ubuntu-based computers to Canada and Latin America.
 Dell began shipping systems with Ubuntu pre-installed in China.
 Acer launched the Linux-based Acer Aspire One.
 In June 2008, the Electronics Corporation of Tamil Nadu (ELCOT), a bulk computer buyer for students in the Indian state of Tamil Nadu, decided to switch entirely to supplying Linux after Microsoft attempted to use its monopoly position to sell the organization Windows bundled with Microsoft Office. ELCOT declined the offer stating "Any such bundling could result in serious exploitation of the consumer."
 In August 2008, IBM cited market disillusionment with Microsoft Vista in announcing a new partnership arrangement with Red Hat, Novell and Canonical to offer "Microsoft-free" personal computers with IBM application software, including Lotus Notes and Lotus Symphony.

2009
 In January 2009, the New York Times stated: "More than 10 million people are estimated to run Ubuntu today".
 In mid-2009, Asus, as part of its It's better with Windows campaign, stopped offering Linux, for which they received strong criticism. The company claimed that competition from other netbook makers drove them to offer only Windows XP. Writing in May 2010 Computerworld columnist Steven J. Vaughan-Nichols said "I'm sure that the real reason is Microsoft has pressured Asus into abandoning Linux. On ASUS' site, you'll now see the slogan 'ASUS recommends Windows 7' proudly shown. Never mind that, while Windows 7 is a good operating system, Windows 7 is awful on netbooks."
 In May 2009, Fedora developer Jef Spaleta estimated on the basis of IP addresses of update downloads and statistics from the voluntary user hardware registration service Smolt that there are 16 million Fedora systems in use. No effort was made to estimate how much the Fedora installed base overlaps with other Linux distributions (enthusiasts installing many distributions on the same system).
 In June 2009, ZDNet reported "Worldwide, there are 13 million active Ubuntu users with use growing faster than any other distribution."

2010
 In April 2010, Chris Kenyon, vice president for OEM at Canonical Ltd., estimated that there were 12 million Ubuntu users.
 In June 2010, a Quebec Superior Court Judge Denis Jacques ruled that the provincial government broke the law when it spent Cdn$720,000, starting in the fall of 2006 to migrate 800 government workstations to Microsoft Windows Vista and Office 2007 without carrying out a "serious and documented search" for alternatives. The search for alternatives was legally required for any expenditures over Cdn$25,000. The court case was brought by Savoir Faire Linux, a small Montreal-based company that had hoped to bid Linux software to replace the government's aging Windows XP. The judge dismissed the government's contention that Microsoft software was chosen because employees were already familiar with Windows and that switching to a different operating system would have cost more.
 In October 2010, a statistics company stated that Android, Google's version of Linux for smartphones (and tablets), had become the most popular operating system among new buyers.

2012
 In November 2012, Top500.org's November 2012 list has all Top 10 Supercomputers as running a distribution of Linux as their Operating System.

2013
 In February 2013, Dice and the Linux Foundation released a survey that showed Linux skills in high demand among employers.
 Valve announces its Linux-based SteamOS for video game consoles.
 Supercomputers, Japan's bullet trains, traffic control, Toyota IVI, NYSE, CERN, FAA air traffic control, nuclear submarines and top websites all use Linux.
 In December 2013, the city of Munich announced that it successfully migrated 12,000 of its 15,000 computers to LiMux Linux and that the savings in 2013 alone were about 10 million euros.

2014
 In September 2014, the Italian city of Turin, the capital of Piedmont, decided to switch to Linux.
 In October 2014, the city of Gummersbach announced that their IT infrastructure now is based on 300 thin clients and 6 servers that run SuSe Linux.
 June 2014, France's National Gendarmerie has completed the migration of 65,000 to Linux "GendBuntu".
 In November 2014 Purism was founded as an OEM Linux manufacturer.

2017

 In November 2017, all 500 of the world's top supercomputers ran Linux.

2018

 In April 2018, Microsoft announced Azure Sphere, a Linux-based operating system for Internet of Things applications.
 In May 2018, pre-orders began for Atari VCS, a gaming console that is powered by the Linux kernel.

2019 

 In May 2019, Microsoft announced Windows Subsystem for Linux 2, which will rely on a pre-installed Linux kernel built by Microsoft. This marks the first time that the Linux kernel has shipped with a Microsoft operating system.
In May 2019, South Korea announced that it was looking to migrate its major government systems to Linux, due to the pending end of support for Windows 7.

2020 
 In June 2020, Lenovo announced Linux certification for ThinkPad and ThinkStation portfolio products.

2021 

 In January 2021, the government of the Argentinian province of Misiones announced that it had developed , a distribution based on the Devuan operating system, specially designed for government offices.
 In February 2021 Linux was first used on Mars when NASA's Perseverance rover landed on 18 February.

See also

References

External links
 O/S market share monthly estimations, based on internet traffic
 Operating System Market Share Worldwide | StatCounter Global Stats
 LinuxWorld: What's Driving Global Linux Adoption?
 OSDL Desktop Linux Client Survey
 Canadian Provincial Medical Association To Use Open Source Platform For EMR Project
 IDC: Latin America Linux Migration Trends 2005
 OSDL Claims Linux Making Major Gains in Global Retail Sector
 Linux Advocacy mini-HOWTO
 Measuring total cost of ownership
 Gartner: Open source will quietly take over 
 IDC: Linux-Related Spending Could Top $49B by 2011
 Red Hat – Open Source Activity Map

Linux
Linux-based devices
Operating system advocacy
Technological change